
Gmina Liniewo is a rural gmina (administrative district) in Kościerzyna County, Pomeranian Voivodeship, in northern Poland.

Villages
Gmina Liniewo contains the villages and settlements of Brzęczek, Bukowe Pole, Chrósty Wysińskie, Chrztowo, Deka, Garczyn, Głodowo, Iłownica, Liniewo, Liniewskie Góry, Lubieszyn, Lubieszynek, Małe Liniewo, Mestwinowo, Milonki, Orle, Płachty, Równe, Rymanowiec, Sobącz, Stary Wiec, Stefanowo and Wysin.

Neighbouring gminas
Gmina Liniewo is bordered by the gminas of Kościerzyna, Nowa Karczma, Skarszewy and Stara Kiszewa.

References
Polish official population figures 2006

Liniewo
Kościerzyna County